Chamum may refer to:
 Chamum-e Bughar